Hampton J. Cheney (1836-1927) was an American Confederate veteran and politician. He served as a member of the Tennessee Senate.

Early life
Hampton J. Cheney was born on June 2, 1836, in Rapides Parish, Louisiana. He graduated from the Western Military Institute in 1858.

Career
Cheney became a farmer. During the American Civil War of 1861–1865, he served as adjutant under General John C. Brown in the Confederate States Army.

Cheney served as assistant postmaster of Nashville from 1888 to 1892. He served as a member of the Tennessee Senate in 1892. He served as the City Comptroller of Nashville from 1898 to 1906.

Personal life and death
Cheney married Amanda E. Stratton, the daughter of Colonel Madison Stratton, in 1858. They had a daughter, Leonora. He was a member of the Improved Order of Red Men, the Fraternal Order of Eagles and the Knights of Pythias. He was also a member of the United Confederate Veterans.

Cheney died on September 12, 1927, in Nashville, Tennessee. His portrait is displayed at the Tennessee State Museum.

References

1836 births
1927 deaths
People from Rapides Parish, Louisiana
Politicians from Nashville, Tennessee
Farmers from Tennessee
Confederate States Army personnel
Tennessee state senators